State Correctional Institution – Waynesburg was a Pennsylvania Department of Corrections minimum security prison in Morgan Township, Greene County, Pennsylvania near Waynesburg.

The property had  of land. As a men's prison it had 220 employees and approximately 450 prisoners.

History
It opened as a minimum security women's prison in July 1984 in a former Pennsylvania Department of Public Welfare youth correctional facility. Women were transferred to SCI Cambridge Springs in 1992, and that year SCI Waynesburg became a men's prison.

Circa 2003 the yearly cost to house prisoners at Waynesburg was $32,685, while the overall Pennsylvania DOC statewide cost was $28,237 and the average cost for its medium security prisons was $21,500. The process of its closing was to begin in August 2003 and finish by some time in 2004.  Basalt Trap Rock Co. bought the prison property for $990,000; Governor of Pennsylvania Ed Rendell approved the sale in July 2005.

References

External links

Greene County, Pennsylvania
State prisons in Pennsylvania
Women's prisons in Pennsylvania
1984 establishments in Pennsylvania
2003 disestablishments in Pennsylvania